Bhamragad is a Village and a taluka and a district sub-division in Gadchiroli district in the Indian state of Maharashtra.

It is located on the right banks of a confluence of three rivers: The Indravati River, a tributary of Godavari river, the Pearl Kota, and the Pamul Gautami. It is also located on the border of Maharashtra and Chhattisgarh states of  India.

Geography
It has an average elevation of 231 metres (761 feet).

It is part of etapalli Sub-division of Gadchiroli district along with Etapalli taluka.

It is located in the dense forests which are also called as Dandkaranya. The most of the population is Madia Gond. These people maintain their traditional lifestyle. Madia Gond children are attending schools. Many now are doctors, paramedics, teachers, police personnel and employees of the government forest department.

Demographics 
As per Indian government census of year 2011, the population of tehsil was 36,325.

Hemalkasa
The Lok Biradari Prakalp is located near Hemalkasa a village in Bhamragad Taluka. This project was founded by Padma Vibhushan Baba Amte, his son Padma Shri Dr. Prakash Amte is the present medical director.

The population of this village is mainly Madia Gond.

Transport
Bhamragad is connected by Buses run by MSRTC to Aheri, Gadchiroli. One can get a bus from Nagpur to Aheri or Allapalli, both are the main transportation hub (located 7 km from each other) for Bhamragad, Bhamragad is 65 km from Allapalli.

Allapalli is the central town connecting Aheri, Sironcha, Ettapalli, Mulchera, Bhamragad (all five taluka). On the Allapalli to Bhamragad route is Talewada, Permilli, Bhandia (River) Kudkelli Phata, Tadgaon, Hemlkasa and then Bhamragad.

These all villages are situated in a unique forest. The forest is very vast, and all kinds of animals like monkeys, snakes etc. could be seen while travelling here.

References

Cities and towns in Gadchiroli district
Talukas in Maharashtra